is one of the preserved throwing techniques, Habukareta Waza, of Judo.
It belonged to the fifth group, Gokyo, of the 1895 Gokyo no Waza lists. It is categorized as a hand technique, Te-waza.

Description
Seoi otoshi begins with one judo player (tori) breaking another's (uke's) balance in the forward, or right front corner direction. Tori turns in for an ippon seoi nage or seoi nage and drops one or both knees to the floor, pulling uke over their shoulder.

Similar techniques

Tai Otoshi 
Similar to Tai Otoshi, Ukes movements can be limited or blocked by Toris leg. In Tai Otoshi the leg off Tori can be extended to push uke over. Extension of the leg in Sei Otoshi will rather lead to a lifting effect due to the fixation point of the working hand.

Seoi Nage 
Similar to (Ippon) Seoi nage, Morote Seoi Nage and, Eri Seoi Nage uke is thrown over the shoulder.

Ganseki Otoshi 
In the video,
The Essence of Judo,
Kyuzo Mifune also demonstrates
, where tori
grabs hold of uke by the lapels to toss uke over.

References

External links
 International Judo Federation - Judo techniques - Seoi Otoshi

Judo technique
Throw (grappling)